Mr. & Mrs. Smith is a 1941 American screwball comedy film directed by Alfred Hitchcock, written by Norman Krasna, and starring Carole Lombard and Robert Montgomery. It also features Gene Raymond, Jack Carson, Philip Merivale, and Lucile Watson.

Although Mr. & Mrs. Smith was the only pure comedy Hitchcock made in America, he later claimed that he agreed to do it only as a favor to Lombard. However, the files at RKO Radio Pictures show that Hitchcock himself actually pursued the project.

Plot

Ann (Carole Lombard) and David Smith (Robert Montgomery) are a married couple living in New York City who, though in love, have disagreements that last for days before they reconcile.

One morning, Ann asks David if he would marry her again if he had it to do over. Although he says he is very happy with her now and wouldn't marry anyone else, he says he would not, because it meant the loss of his freedom and independence.

Later that day, Harry Deever (Charles Halton), an Idaho county official, informs David at work that due to a jurisdictional mishap, their three-year-old marriage in Idaho was not valid. Since Deever is a family acquaintance of Ann's from Idaho, he stops by their apartment to tell Ann and her mother (Esther Dale) the same thing. Ann does not mention this to David. She believes he will remarry her that very night when he invites her to a romantic dinner at the restaurant they frequented before they were married.

When they arrive at the restaurant, it has declined in quality and become rundown, and they return home. Ann grows impatient and confronts David, accusing him of not wanting to marry her again. David protests and claims he was going to ask her shortly, but Ann dismisses him and kicks him out of their apartment.
David spends the night at his club, but when he goes home after work the next day Ann's maid refuses him entry. David waits in the lobby and sees Ann return with an older gentleman. Believing the man is her suitor, David becomes angry and disheartened. He intercepts Ann and threatens to withhold financial support. He gets her fired from her new job (the older gentleman is both her suitor and her new boss). Ann tells David she has no intention of ever marrying him again.

David's friend and law partner, Jefferson "Jeff" Custer (Gene Raymond), tells David he will talk to Ann and persuade her to remarry. However, when David arrives that evening, he finds that Jeff has instead agreed to legally represent Ann and goes through the various legal outcomes. Jeff asks Ann to dinner the following night in David's presence. David tells Ann that if she agrees to the date their marriage is over, but Ann accepts the invitation.

After dinner, Ann and Jeff go to the 1939 New York World's Fair, but they become stuck on the parachute ride and are exposed to hours of rain many feet up in the air. When they get back to Jeff's apartment, he plans to put on dry clothes and return to the fair, but Ann feeds the teetotaler "medicinal" liquor ostensibly to prevent a cold, and he becomes drunk. Ann returns home.

Ann and Jeff continue to date and meets Jeff's parents. They decide to take a vacation with Jeff's parents at a Lake Placid skiing resort; the same resort where Ann and David had earlier been planning to holiday. Upon arriving at the resort, they find that David has rented a cabin next to theirs. When confronted, David faints. David pretends to be sick and delirious while Ann fawns over him. When Ann discovers his deception, she becomes furious. While they argue heatedly, Jeff walks in. He knows Ann and David are meant for each other when Ann tries to manipulate Jeff into fighting David.

Ann decides she wants to get away to the lodge by ski, even though she does not know how to ski. David offers to help her put on her skis, but instead places her in a position that prevents her from standing up. As she struggles and threatens him, she frees one foot, but then feigns helplessness by reattaching the ski. David realizes her pretense, and silences her ranting by kissing her.

Cast

 Carole Lombard as Ann Smith
 Robert Montgomery as David Smith
 Gene Raymond as Jefferson Custer
 Jack Carson as Chuck Benson
 Philip Merivale as Ashley Custer
 Lucile Watson as Mrs. Custer
 William Tracy as Sammy
 Charles Halton as Harry Deever
 Esther Dale as Mrs. Krausheimer
 Emma Dunn as Martha
 Betty Compson as Gertie
 Patricia Farr as Gloria
 William Edmunds as Proprietor at Lucy's
 Adele Pearce as Lily
 Emory Parnell as Conway

Alfred Hitchcock can be seen passing Montgomery in front of his apartment building - walking from left to right and smoking a cigar - as the camera pulls back, at 42:58 minutes into the film. To the delight of the crew, Lombard herself directed Hitchcock in the brief scene, forcing him to redo his very simple part many times.

Production
Norman Krasna came up with the basic idea of Mr. & Mrs. Smith (under the original working titles of "Who Was That Lady I Seen You With?" and "No for an Answer") and pitched it to Carole Lombard, who was enthusiastic. She sold the idea to George Schaefer of RKO who agreed to buy the project from Krasna, then Alfred Hitchcock became involved. In the 1939 interview What I Do to the Stars, Hitchcock is about to leave England for Hollywood and says he would like to make a movie with Carole Lombard, casting her not in one of her superficial comedies, but in a serious role, because he believes she could be as good a serious actor as Paul Muni or Leslie Howard. The result was Mr. and Mrs. Smith. Hitchcock was never happy with the result and was later dismissive of the film.

Mr. & Mrs. Smith was the last film released before  Lombard's death. To Be or Not to Be (1942) was her final film, released two months after she died in an aircraft crash while on a War Bond tour.

The film is one of the earliest to show a pizzeria and was supposed to contain sounds of a toilet flushing, which was altered to banging pipes for reasons of censorship.

Reception
Mr. & Mrs. Smith was a hit and made a profit of $750,000. The review in The New York Times described the film thus: "Despite the performances, despite the endless camera magic with which Mr. Hitchcock tries to conceal the thinness of his material, Mr. and Mrs. Smith have their moments of dullness. The result is a chucklesome comedy that fails to mount into a coruscating wave of laughter". Variety reviewers were more enthusiastic about the film, noting: "Alfred Hitchcock pilots the story in a straight farcical groove without resort to slapstick interludes or overplaying by the characters. Pacing his assignment at a steady gait, Hitchcock catches all of the laugh values from the above par script of Norman Krasna".

Adaptations in other media
Lux Radio Theatre adapted Mr. & Mrs. Smith to radio on June 9, 1941, with Carole Lombard and Bob Hope. The Screen Guild Theater next adapted it on February 8, 1942, with Errol Flynn and Lana Turner, again on December 14, 1942 with Joan Bennett, Robert Young, and Ralph Bellamy, and once more on January 1, 1945, with Preston Foster, Louise Allbritton, and Stuart Erwin. On January 30, 1949, it was adapted to Screen Director's Playhouse with Robert Montgomery, Mary Jane Croft, and Carleton Young.

References

Bibliography

 McGilligan, Patrick. "Norman Krasna: The Woolworth's Touch". Backstory: Interviews with Screenwriters of Hollywood's Golden Age. Berkeley, California: University of California Press, 1986. .
 Spoto, Donald. The Dark Side of Genius: The Life of Alfred Hitchcock. New York: Da Capo, 1999. .

External links

 
 
 
 
 Review of film at Variety

1940s English-language films
1940s screwball comedy films
1941 films
1941 romantic comedy films
American black-and-white films
American romantic comedy films
American screwball comedy films
Comedy of remarriage films
Fictional married couples
Films directed by Alfred Hitchcock
Films set in 1940
Films set in New York (state)
RKO Pictures films
World's fairs in fiction
1940s American films